"Old and Wise" is a power ballad by the Alan Parsons Project from the album Eye in the Sky.

The song reached number 21 on the U.S. Billboard AC chart  in early 1983 and number 74 in the United Kingdom; the first of the band's singles to chart in that country.

Lead vocal
The lead vocal on the original release of "Old and Wise" was performed by former Zombies vocalist Colin Blunstone. Blunstone made several appearances on Alan Parsons Project albums, but "Old and Wise" was the only single with Blunstone as lead singer to gain airplay. Blunstone later re-recorded the song for his own two-disc Best Of album, titled Old and Wise, released in 2003.

However, an early (demo?) version (without orchestration or the saxophone solo) features Eric Woolfson singing lead. It was included as one of the bonus tracks on the 2007 remastered edition of Eye in the Sky.

Cover versions
Herman van Veen covered the song on his 1992 album You Take My Breath Away (Herman van Veen sings Pop Classics).
Viktoria Tolstoy on her 2006 album Pictures of Me.
British pensioners group The Zimmers recorded a cover of the song in 2008, with vocals by Peter Oakley.
Israeli musician Sagi Rei on album Diamond, Jade & Pearls.
Jadis included a cover on their 2001 compilation album Medium Rare.

Sampling
Kendrick Lamar sampled "Old and Wise" on "Keisha's Song (Her Pain)", from his album Section.80.
B.o.B sampled "Old and Wise" on "Campaign", from his mixtape Fuck Em We Ball.
Pryda sampled vocals from "Old and Wise" on the song "Shadows" from his album Eric Prydz Presents Pryda.
Fat Jon sampled the song in "Everywhere" (track 4) of Lightweight Heavy.
Styles P sampled the song on "Shadows", from the 2010 album The Green Ghost Project.
Daft Punk sampled two micro vocal samples for their single "Face to Face" from the 2001 album Discovery.

References 

Songs about old age
1982 singles
1982 songs
1980s ballads
The Alan Parsons Project songs
Arista Records singles
Rock ballads
Song recordings produced by Alan Parsons
Songs written by Alan Parsons
Songs written by Eric Woolfson